Głuszyno Pomorskie railway station is in Poland. Most trains are departing to: Sopot, Pruszcz Gdański, Gdynia Główna, Gdańsk Wrzeszcz, Gdańsk Oliwa, Gdańsk Główny, Tczew, Gdańsk Orunia, Gdynia Orłowo, and Skowarcz. There are around 50 trains in the weekdays that departs from this station.

Lines crossing the station

Train services
The station is served by the following services:

Regional services (R) Tczew — Słupsk  
Regional services (R) Malbork — Słupsk  
Regional services (R) Elbląg — Słupsk  
Regional services (R) Słupsk — Bydgoszcz Główna 
Regional services (R) Słupsk — Gdynia Główna

References 

Railway stations in Pomeranian Voivodeship